Need for Speed III: Hot Pursuit is a 1998 racing video game developed for PlayStation by EA Canada and Microsoft Windows by EA Seattle, and published by Electronic Arts. It is the third major installment in the Need for Speed franchise, incorporating police pursuits as a major part of gameplay. Hot Pursuit remains focused on racing using exotic sports cars, but features races that primarily take place in locations within North America, including varied settings and climates. Police AI is improved over the first game, utilizing several tactics to stop both the player and opponent. The PlayStation version was released on March 25, 1998, while the Windows version was released on October 12 the same year. The game received critical success for its time, with praise for its graphics and fast action. It received a direct sequel in 2002 and a reboot in 2010.

Gameplay
With police pursuits reintegrated into the game, Hot Pursuits gameplay now consists of two categories. The first encompasses standard racing, as it has been in its predecessors, The Need for Speed and Need for Speed II, in which the player is allowed to race against one (including split-screen races) or seven other racers in normal circuit racers, knockouts, or tournaments (which allow the player to unlock bonus vehicles and a bonus track). The second category is dubbed "Hot Pursuit", where police pursuits are included in races; the mode allows the player to select a standard sports car to race against a single opponent in a police-scattered track. The PC version also contains a role reversal variation in which players select a police version of a sports car to pursue and stop all six racers before they complete the race. Completing the Hot Pursuit challenges in both roles in the PC version on every track of the game unlocks additional police sports cars.

Two modes were introduced in the game. The two-player split-screen mode allows two players to race using the same computer. The "Knockout" mode consists of seven races with eight racers on randomly chosen tracks, in which conditions such as selected difficulty, weather, and so on that the player has chosen before starting the race-series will apply. Each race consists of two laps where the driver who finishes last will be eliminated from the race lineup. All other drivers advance to the next round and carry on with the battle until there is only one player left, who technically wins the knockout competition. The standard "Tournament" mode consists of eight opponents in a four-lap race on randomly selected tracks and choices made by the player as in the knockout mode take effect when the tournament is started. The game supports network play through a serial port, modem, or IPX, and online gaming through TCP/IP protocol. It also allowed spawn installations of itself to be installed on other machines.

Racing tracks range from desert canyons to countryside villages, as well as snow-capped mountain ranges. Most tracks contain one or more secret shortcuts.

Car tuning was also introduced, which allowed any car's handling to be customized by adjusting low or high-end properties for engine tuning and gear ratios, front or back brake balance, slow or fast braking speed, soft or stiff suspension, low or high aerodynamics as well as rain or racing tires. Any of these options could be modified via sliders to offer a digit-sensitive, percentage-based effect to the selected car's overall performance. Higher-end engine and gear tuning, for example, will compromise acceleration for better top speed. Rear-based brake balance and slow braking speeds make for wider, drifting turns, and aerodynamics provide even higher speeds at the loss of handling.

Pursuit system

Hot Pursuits pursuit system has been significantly improved in terms of AI and police tactics over The Need for Speed. The game now requires that the racer only stops near a pursuing police car to be ticketed or arrested by the police, as opposed to being overtaken by a police car, forcing the racer to pull over for the same punishments. Accordingly, police cars are now programmed with the ability to block a racer's car in an attempt to halt them. In addition, whereas the original Need for Speed would only have a single police car chasing a racer in each pursuit, Hot Pursuit allows more police cars to pursue a racer, opening up the opportunity for them to collectively ambush the racer's car.

Tactical aspects of the police pursuits have also been improved. The police have the ability to deploy roadblocks which has computer-controlled police cars form a wall across the road, and spike strips which puncture the tires of a racer's car, bringing it to a halt. Both tactics present weaknesses, specifically gaps in the blockade that can be used by a racer to avoid collisions with police cars, or tire punctures from a spike strip which is only deployed on one side of the road. The player may also listen to police radio chatter on the pursuits' statuses, revealing to them the current locations of racers, police cars, as well as roadblocks and spike strips. The radio chatter also reveals reactions to specific events, such as a racer's collision with a parked police car, as well as referencing the racer's passing speed and the occurrence of the race itself ("It looks like the cars are racing!"). Furthermore, if a computer-controlled racer's driving conduct proves to be more dangerous (also chosen by the player) than that of the racer's, the police may relent their pursuit of the player and chase the AI instead.

Reception

The PlayStation version of Need for Speed III: Hot Pursuit received "favorable" reviews, just two points shy of "universal acclaim", according to the review aggregation website Metacritic. Next Generations July 1998 issue called the same console version "an excellent racer for both novice and expert enthusiasts. Hopefully EA will continue to improve the engine so that NFSIV offers a great two-player experience as well." Five issues later, the magazine said of the PC version, "Add the fine 3D-accelerated graphics, lightning-fast response to the controller, incredible weather effects, and impressively valued terrain, and you've got a winner." James Price of Official UK PlayStation Magazine gave the PlayStation version seven out of ten, saying, "While certainly accomplished, Need for Speed 3  is hamstrung – in a direct head-to-head with Gran Turismo, EA's title just can't compete. It's a great shame because it's one of the most playable racing games released in the past year." In Japan, where the same PlayStation version was ported for release under the name  on September 23, 1998, Famitsu gave it a score of 29 out of 40.

AllGame gave the PlayStation and PC versions each four-and-a-half stars out of five, with Shawn Sackenheim saying of the former, "All things considered, Need for Speed 3 is a blast! A bit hard at first in the tournaments but the hot pursuit and two player modes will have you racing well into the night for weeks on end"; and Jonathan Sutyak calling the latter "a great game because of the ability to play as the police and take part in multiplayer games. Take away those two modes and you have a basic racing game with great graphics." However, Edge gave the former version seven out of ten, saying that it "doesn't manage to regain the 'rawness' of the first installment, remaining a fun title that will undoubtedly gain admirers at the expertise of most racing afficionados."

The game was heralded during its time for its intense action and beautiful graphics. Edge praised the design of the game's tracks and challenging police pursuits, but criticized the weightlessness of some cars for "failing to convince the player of any realistic dynamics at work."

The game reached number 10 in the UK charts. In the US, the PC version sold 276,000 copies during 1999 alone, at an average of $25. In February 1999, the same PC version received a "Gold" sales award from the Verband der Unterhaltungssoftware Deutschland (VUD), indicating sales of at least 100,000 units across Germany, Austria and Switzerland.

The same PC version was a finalist for Computer Games Strategy Plus 1998 "Racing Game of the Year" award, which ultimately went to Motocross Madness. The staff said that the game offers "great looks, and excellent racing action." PC Gamer US likewise nominated the game as the best racing game of 1998, although it lost again to Motocross Madness. They wrote, "For pure arcade rush, it's hard to beat Electronic Arts' thrilling Need for Speed III." It won the "Personal Computer: Simulation Game of the Year" award at AIAS' Second Interactive Achievement Awards, the "Best Driving" award at Computer Gaming Worlds 1999 Premier Awards, and the "Driving Game of the Year" award at GameSpots Best & Worst of 1998 Awards. It was also nominated for Best Multiplayer Game and Best Racing Game at the 1998 CNET Gamecenter Awards, for "Console: Racing Game of the Year" at AIAS' Second Interactive Achievement Awards, for the "Best Racing Game" award at the 1998 OPM Editors' Awards, and for the "Best Racing Game of the Year" award at IGNs Best of 1998 Awards, all of which went to StarCraft, Grand Prix Legends, Gran Turismo, and Powerslide, respectively.

Notes

References

External links
 

1998 video games
Electronic Arts games
Interactive Achievement Award winners
 03
PlayStation (console) games
Split-screen multiplayer games
Video games about police officers
Video games developed in Canada
Video games scored by Rom Di Prisco
Video games scored by Saki Kaskas
Windows games
Video games set in the United States
D.I.C.E. Award for Strategy/Simulation Game of the Year winners
Video games developed in the United States